Montenegro competed at the 2013 Summer Universiade in Kazan, Russia from 6 to 17 July 2013.

Shooting 

Men

Women

Water polo 

Preliminary round

External links 
 Montenegro at the 2013 Summer Universiade

Nations at the 2013 Summer Universiade
Univ
Montenegro at the Summer Universiade